Eberhard-Ludwigs-Gymnasium is a gymnasium in Stuttgart established in 1686.

History
The school was established in 1686 as Gymnasium illustre (zu Stuttgart), seemingly honouring the Illustrious Gymnasium in Gotha, known by that name since about 1600. In 1881, during the reign of Charles I of Württemberg, because of overcrowding, the Karls-Gymnasium was established and took over 18 of its 39 classes. At this time, it changed its name to the current one after Eberhard Louis, Duke of Württemberg, who had been under age and under guardianship at the time of the school's foundation.

Building
The first building in what is today, Gymnasiumstraße in Stuttgart, was built in 1686 and converted in 1840. A new building erected in 1903 in Holzgartenstraße was destroyed in 1944 during a nocturnal bomb attack on Stuttgart. The school was then accommodated in the buildings of the Zeppelin-Gymnasium until the new buildings on the site of the former villa of Ferdinand von Zeppelin at Herdweg 72 had been completed in 1957.

The new building was developed by a team led by the architect Hans Bregler, a former pupil who had completed his abitur in 1941. This building became heritage protected because of its prize-winning architecture (Paul Bonatz Prize 1959).

Principals from 1920
Dr. Herrmann Binder (1920-1944)
Rudolf Griesinger (1947-1950)
Walter Sontheimer (1950-1957)
Walter Haussmann (1958-1973)
Dr. Frank Weidauer (1974-1989)
Peter Mommsen (1990-2002)
Ulrich Kernen (2002-2010)
Karin Winkler (since 2010)

Notable alumni
 Berthold Auerbach 
 Fritz Bauer
 Christoph Blumhardt
 Johann Christoph Blumhardt
 Vicco von Bülow alias Loriot
 Johann Friedrich Cotta
 Julius Euting
 Berndt Feuerbacher
 Karl von Gerok
 Eugen Gerstenmaier
 Theophil Friedrich von Hack
 Georg Herwegh
 Georg Wilhelm Friedrich Hegel
 Otto Hirsch
 Kurt Huber
 Frank Otfried July
 Werner Krauss
 Peter Lohmeyer
 Eduard Mörike
 Robert Mohl
 Konstantin Freiherr von Neurath
 Carl Orff
 Bodo Pieroth
 Jakob Friedrich Reiff
 Josef Rieck
 Karl Schefold
 Paul Schlack
 Rüdiger Schleicher
 Rolf Schlierer
 Gustav Schwab
 Ernst von Sieglin
 Julius Speer
 Hans Spemann
 Claus Graf Schenk von Stauffenberg
 Karl Friedrich Stroheker
 Fred Uhlmann
 Wilhelm Waiblinger
 Gustav Werner
 Bernhard Zeller
 Wilhelm Zimmermann

Notes

External links
 Website of the Eberhard-Ludwigs-Gymnasium

Schools in Stuttgart
1686 establishments in the Holy Roman Empire
Educational institutions established in the 1680s
People educated at Eberhard-Ludwigs-Gymnasium